Es ist soweit (German for "The time has come") is the seventh album by German rock band Böhse Onkelz. It was released in 1990.

Track listing
10 Jahre (10 Years)
Nekrophil (Necrophiliac)
Wilde Jungs (Wild Boys)
Nichts ist für die Ewigkeit (Nothing is for Eternity)
Wenn du einsam bist (If You Are Lonely)
Keine ist wie du (No-one Is Like You)
Hast du Sehnsucht nach der Nadel (Do You Long for the Needle)
Paradies (Paradise)
Das Leben ist ein Spiel (Life is a Game)
Es ist soweit (It's Time)
Leiden (Suffering)

Track notes

10 Jahre
Though the title could suggest it, this is not a song to celebrate 10 years of Böhse Onkelz, but a song against the press and other media.

Nekrophil
This song is about a necrophile man which has a "relationship" with a dead person.

Wilde Jungs
Wilde Jungs (wild boys) is about their time as teenagers / young men.

Nichts ist für die Ewigkeit
Nichts ist für die Ewigkeit (Nothing is for eternity) handles the fact that everything comes to an end.
In this song the band brings themselves in context "Habt ihr noch nicht erkannt warum es Böhse Onkelz gibt"->"Don´t you know yet, why there´s Böhse Onkelz"

Wenn Du einsam bist
This song treats the topic nightmares

Keine ist wie du
The song about the first tattoo and the pleasure of getting tattooed.

Hast Du Sehnsucht nach der Nadel
Stephan Weidner wrote this song for the singer Kevin Russell, who was heavily drug-dependently and tried to get Kevin to a first step to become clean.

Das Leben ist ein Spiel
"Life is a game, you can win or lose" The message of this song is: No risk, no fun.

Böhse Onkelz albums
1990 albums
German-language albums